Barentsburg
Longyearbyen
Ny-Ålesund
Pyramiden
Sveagruva 
Nybyen 
Bear Island 
Hopen
Hornsund

Former settlements 
Harlingen kokerij
Kobbefjorden
Engelskbukta
Gravneset
Gåshamna
Grumant 
Hiorthhamn
Lægerneset
Port Louis
Smeerenburg
Ytre Norskøya
Note: some cities are abandoned

Jan Mayen
Olonkinbyen
Puppebu
Flyplassen terminal/toll
Frydenlund

Svalbard-related lists